Poropuntius brevispinus is a species of cyprinid in the genus Poropuntius. It inhabits inland wetlands in Vietnam. It has been assessed as "data deficient" on the IUCN Red List and is considered harmless to humans.

References

Cyprinid fish of Asia
Fish of Vietnam
IUCN Red List data deficient species